Hoa Cam Concrete JSC (CTCP Bê tông Hoà Cầm; HASTC:HCC) is a construction materials company in Vietnam, specializing in the manufacture and distribution of concrete, cement, sand and stone. It has participated in major construction projects including hydropower plants, electricity transmission networks and office buildings.  Hoa Cam is located in Da Nang and its main markets are Da Nang Province, Quảng Nam Province and Dung Quat Economic Zone of the South Central Coast region. It is listed on the Hanoi Securities Trading Center.

See also
Gravel
Gravel pit
Sand mining
List of companies in Vietnam

References
See External links.

External links
Hoa Cam Concrete official site
Google finance, Hoa Cam Concrete JSC

Companies listed on the Hanoi Stock Exchange
Cement companies of Vietnam
Vietnamese brands
Da Nang